Gaius Valerius Eudaemon was a Roman  who held a number of military and civilian positions during the reigns of the Emperors Hadrian and Antoninus Pius, which includes praefectus of Roman Egypt. He is known as a close friend of the emperor Hadrian.

His career is documented in two inscriptions. One is in Latin from Ephesus, erected by an imperial freedman named Hermes. The name of the subject is missing, but from the other inscription, erected in Syria and written in Greek, Eudaemon is confirmed as the subject.

The date of his death is not known, although he may be the same Eudaemon Marcus Aurelius mentions in a list of dead men he looked up to, along with Demetrius and Aulus Claudius Charax.

Career 
Eudaemon first appears in history when Hadrian appointed him , or "procurator of Emperor Hadrian for the administration of Alexandria". "Eudaemon was evidently dispatched almost at once to Egypt", Birley writes, given a minor posting "to keep an eye on things there." Birley speculates that he arrived with a letter of dismissal for the current prefect, Marcus Rutilius Lupus.

Birley further speculates that Eudaemon also encouraged Hadrian "to issue an edict confirming the privileges to philosophers, rhetors, and doctors granted by Vespasian and Trajan."

His next recorded appointment was to manage the Greek and Latin libraries at Rome.

Further appointments followed. Eudaemon held a procuratorship in Asia Minor comprising Lycia, Pamphylia, Galatia, Paphlagonia, Pisidia and Pontus, with a salary of over 100,000 sesterces. This is an abnormal combination of two appointments, the first concerning Rome and the second in the provinces; Henriette Pavis d'Escurac explains this combination with the supposition that Hadrian took Eudaemon with him on his travels in the East. Eudaemon then became , probably when Hadrian spent the winter of 129/130 in Antioch. The Greek inscription allows us to add more two posts to the career of Valerius Eudaemon, which includes a palatine secretariat.

The Historia Augusta notes that Hadrian turned against many of his friendships by the last years of his reign, providing a list of names that includes Eudaemon, whom Hadrian "reduced to poverty." However, after a space of several years Antoninus Pius rehabilitated him. We know that Eudaemon was appointed governor of Egypt, which he held from 142 to 143.

His primary concern as governor of Egypt was to safeguard the harvest and delivery of grain to the populace of Rome, but surviving letters from his administration show his responsibilities extended further. One concerns his investigation and grant of immunity from liturgy to a doctor who mummified corpses. Another also concerns the liturgy: in it Valerius Eudaemon berates a village clerk for nominating a man to this responsibility, who was too poor to handle this responsibility, and as a result fled his farm and home.

References

Further reading 
 Hans-Georg Pflaum,  (Paris, 1961), no. 110
 William Linn Westermann, "The Prefect Valerius Eudaemon and the Indigent Liturgist", Journal of Egyptian Archaeology, 40 (1954), pp. 107-111

2nd-century Romans
2nd-century Roman governors of Egypt
Ancient Roman equites
Roman governors of Egypt
Eudaemon
Praefecti annonae